María Blanca Fiorella Renzi Gil ( María Blanca Gil Paradela; born 19 October 1949), better known as Fiorella Faltoyano, is a Spanish actress.

Career
Fiorella Faltoyano took dramatic studies, and in 1967 debuted in Nati Mistral's theater company. Almost at the same time she appeared in the  film Club de solteros.

In 1977, she achieved her greatest film success as a protagonist of Unfinished Business by José Luis Garci, with whom she continued working in Solos en la madrugada (1978) – again with José Sacristán – and in Cradle Song (1994). She shot other films, among them La colmena (1982) and Después del sueño (1992) by Mario Camus, ¡Biba la banda! (Ricardo Palacios, 1987), La sombra del ciprés es alargada (Luis Alcoriza, 1990), and La sal de la vida (Eugenio Martín, 1996).

In the theater she starred in The Odd Couple (2001–02), The Children's Hour (2004–07), Agnes of God (2007–09), and Galdosiana (2009–10), plays in which she shared billing and production work with the actress  through her company, Nueva Comedia.

Personal life
Of Galician and Castilian origin, the biological daughter of an unmarried couple -- Ramón Pardo Arias (1909–1998), native and later mayor of Ferreira de Pantón, Lugo, and María de la Asunción Gil Paradela (1921–2007), a native of Madrid, 

Fiorella Faltoyano was born María Blanca Gil Paradela but later took the surname (Renzi) of her Italian stepfather. She 
spent summers near Ferreira de Pantón with her family. She has two half-brothers, Mauricio and Constantino, children of her mother's marriage with businessman Constantino Faltoyano.

Marriage and offspring
She has one son, Daniel Tafur Renzi, from her marriage to producer José Luis Tafur Carande (1929–2012). She later became the romantic partner of director .

Books published
 Aprobé en septiembre, La Esfera de los Libros, 2014,

Filmography

Television

Awards
 Medal of the Círculo de Escritores Cinematográficos as Best Actress for Cradle Song (1994)

 Named Rabaliana 2012 by the Milana Bonita Association

References

External links
 

1949 births
20th-century Spanish actresses
21st-century Spanish actresses
Living people
People from Málaga
Spanish film actresses
Spanish stage actresses
Spanish telenovela actresses